Oversight Committee can refer to:

 IETF Administrative Oversight Committee
 United States House Committee on Oversight and Government Reform
 Norwegian Parliamentary Intelligence Oversight Committee
 Committee I or the Permanent Oversight Committee on the Intelligence and Security Services
 Parliamentary Oversight Panel, in German Parlamentarisches Kontrollgremium (PKGr)